James Edmund Halligan (June 23, 1936October 25, 2022) was an  American state senator from Oklahoma and Oklahoma State University president. Halligan defeated Robert "Bob" Murphy in 2008, gaining a Republican seat in the state senate and helping to deliver his party control for the first time in state history.

Early life
Halligan was born in Moorland, Iowa, on June 23, 1936.  He joined the US Air Force and served for four years as a Bulgarian translator.  He then studied chemical engineering at Iowa State University, obtaining his undergraduate, master's, and Doctor of Philosophy degrees from that institution.

Academic career
After being awarded his doctorate, Halligan was briefly employed in the petroleum industry.  He subsequently taught as a faculty member, and served as department chair and dean of engineering at the University of Arkansas, Texas Tech University, and New Mexico State University (NMSU).  He was appointed president of NMSU in 1984 and served in that capacity for a decade before becoming the sixteenth president of Oklahoma State University (OSU) on August 1, 1994.

During his tenure at OSU, Halligan emphasized increasing retention and graduation rates, halting a 12-year trend of decreasing student enrollments.  He also encouraged the development of national scholars, and investing more than $200 million in student facilities on campus, including multi-media classrooms and suite-style student accommodation.  Halligan oversaw the university's first capital campaign that ultimately raised more than $260 million, which was over twice the initial goal.  He also contributed towards "Raise the Roof" for Gallagher-Iba Arena, which was named by CBS Sportsline as the country's best college basketball venue in 2001.  OSU was recognized as "America's Best College Buy" and a "Truman Honor Institution" under his leadership.

Throughout his presidency, Halligan and his wife hosted thousands of OSU students in their home every year.  They also promoted events run by students such as Orange Peel, Homecoming, Varsity Review and Into the Streets.  They were credited with steering the university through the aftermath of the plane crash in January 2001 that killed ten members of the Oklahoma State Cowboys basketball team and their flight crew.  He announced his retirement in May 2002.

Political career
Halligan ran for state senator in Oklahoma's 21st district (encompassing Stillwater) and was elected.  He served two terms in that capacity and was a member of various committees, including appropriations, education, energy, business and commerce, finance, and rules.  During his time in the Oklahoma Senate, Halligan voted in favor of an independent audit of the state department of education, and against the repeal of the state grocery sales tax.  He also authored a bill passed in February 2015 that banned the use of tobacco on campuses.  On August 12, 2015, Halligan released a statement through the Oklahoma State Senate announcing that he would not seek reelection to a third term and that the 2016 legislative session would be his last.

Personal life
Halligan was married to Ann until his death.  Together, they had three children: Mike, Pat and Chris.  After retiring from Oklahoma State, he resided in Stillwater.

Halligan died on the morning of October 25, 2022, at Integris Hospital in Oklahoma City.  He was 86 years old.

Election history

See also
 Oklahoma State Senate
 Oklahoma Republican Party
 Politics of Oklahoma

References

External links
 Homepage of the Oklahoma State Senate

1936 births
2022 deaths
Oklahoma State University faculty
Presidents of Oklahoma State University
Republican Party Oklahoma state senators
21st-century American politicians
People from Webster County, Iowa
Iowa State University alumni
Military personnel from Iowa